This article is about the idea in anthropology.  For the concept in human cognition, see Recognition memory.

Strength theory, the strength hypothesis or strength differences is an idea in anthropology and gender studies.  Scholars use it to explain why some cultures assign some forms of work to women and other forms of work to men.  In a strength theory model, cultures give certain tasks to men because men are stronger.

Ember et al. give the examples of mining and hunting large animals, which are heavily male-dominated in many cultures.  They note, however, that this does not explain why men would be assigned other tasks that do not require significant strength, such as trapping smaller animals.  They and other scholars also note that there are cultures in which women do hunt large animals.

History

George P. Murdock was one of the first scholars to describe this theory formally and with evidence.  He did so in Social Forces in 1937.

Criticism

Strength theory does not explain why societies do assign some very heavy work to women and not to men.

See also
Male expendability
Economy-of-effort theory
Division of labor

References

Anthropology
Gender